David J. Sargent (born 1931) was the President of Suffolk University in Boston, Massachusetts from 1989 to 2010.

Sargent is a native of Newport, New Hampshire and graduated from the Suffolk University Law School magna cum laude in 1954, ranked number one and president of his class. He was admitted to the bar in Massachusetts and New Hampshire that same year.

He returned as an adjunct professor in 1956 and soon became a full professor. From 1972 to 1989, Sargent directed the Law School as dean. Sargent assumed the university presidency in 1989. The Sargent building (1999) which houses Suffolk University Law School is named after him.

In its November 17, 2008 compensation survey, The Chronicle of Higher Education listed Sargent as the highest paid college or university president in the United States. Sargent's compensation in 2006-2007 totaled $2.8 million.

On Wednesday, October 20, 2010, an e-mail was sent to the student body of Suffolk University announcing the retirement of Sargent. He was awarded the position of president emeritus due to his "extraordinary years of service to Suffolk University." Sargent spent 21 years as the president of the university.

References and external links 
Suffolk University Bio
2008 College President Compensation Survey

References

See also 
Suffolk University
Suffolk University Law School

1931 births
Living people
Deans of law schools in the United States
People from Newport, New Hampshire
Presidents of Suffolk University
Suffolk University Law School alumni